Dawn Creekmore (born February 28, 1965) is an American politician who served in the Arkansas House of Representatives from the 27th district from 2005 to 2011. She lives in Hensley, Arkansas.

References

1965 births
Living people
Democratic Party members of the Arkansas House of Representatives